The 2018 Cape Verdean Football Championship season is the 39th beginner level (likely amateur) competition of the first-tier football in Cape Verde. Also it was another season that it was sponsored by a clothing company Tecnicil, it was also known as the 2018 Cape Verdean Tecnicil football season or the 2018 Tecnicil Football Championships.  The championship was governed by the Cape Verdean Football Federation. The season began earlier started on 7 April 2018 and finished on 2 June.

Académica da Praia won their only national championship title, their last Cape Verdean title was won in 1965 which was a provincial title, used until independence in 1975. Académica Praia will likely to participate in the CAF Champions League competition in 2018, no runner-up of the championships, Mindelense will participate in the  2017 CAF Confederation Cup

Overview
The triangular phase was used for the second straight time, fifth overall, it was also the second season with four clubs each and with playoffs. A total of 12 clubs participated in the competition, one from each island league and one who won the last season's title.  The top club from each group qualified for the first time as well as the club with the most points of a second position of each group qualified into the semis.

The finals featured only one leg, the last time that the championship had one leg was in 1985. The final was played in Porto Novo, the most populated place in the island of Santo Antão. A week after the championship final, the cup final took place.

A total of 12 clubs participated in the national championship (Campeonato Nacional). Cape Verdean clubs of the nine inhabited islands played between late 2017 and early 2018 in the eleven regional leagues (Santiago and Santo Antão ha stwo each), where each championship (league) winner qualified for the national championship. The defending champions Sporting Praia also qualified, the club finished fourth in the regional season, four positions Académica Praia, made the next few seasons that a club qualified only as 2017 national champions.

The season was the second time featuring three groups where the top three qualifies alongside the second placed club with the most points (if one has the same, it may include the most goals scored) into the knockout phase.

FC Belo Horizonte, based in Juncalinho in the east of São Nicolau was the recent first timer into the national championships, also it was the next from that island in nearly 28 years being fourth ever.

Group A featured the champions of Boa Vista, Santo Antão South, Santiago South and São Vicente, Group B featured the champions of Brava, Santo Antão North, Santiago North and São Nicolau and Group C featured the national champion of the previous season and champions of Fogo, Maio and Sal.

Académica Praia and Mindelense met three times in the season, the group stage and the final, the next in two seasons, also it was the first that the club met twice in group stage and once in the final.

Participating clubs

Group stage
Final table.

Group A

Group B

Group C

Knockout stage

Semifinals

First legs

Final

See also
2017–18 in Cape Verdean football
2018 Taça Nacional de Cabo Verde

Notes

References

External links

2017 Cape Verdean Football Championships at RSSSF

Cape Verdean Football Championship seasons
1
Cape Verde